This is a list of the National Register of Historic Places listings in Delaware County, Iowa.

This is intended to be a complete list of the properties and districts on the National Register of Historic Places in Delaware County, Iowa, United States.  Latitude and longitude coordinates are provided for many National Register properties and districts; these locations may be seen together in a map.

There are 14 properties and districts listed on the National Register in the county.  One additional property was once listed but has since been removed.

Current listings

|}

Former listings

|}

See also

 List of National Historic Landmarks in Iowa
 National Register of Historic Places listings in Iowa
 Listings in neighboring counties: Buchanan, Clayton, Dubuque, Fayette, Jones, Linn

References

 
Delaware
Buildings and structures in Delaware County, Iowa